Lucky Days is a 1935 British comedy film directed by Reginald Denham and starring Chili Bouchier, Whitmore Humphries and Leslie Perrins.It was made at British and Dominions Elstree Studios as a quota quickie.

Cast
 Chili Bouchier as Patsy Cartwright  
 Whitmore Humphries as Paul Cartwright  
 Leslie Perrins as Jack Hurst  
 Ann Codrington as Eve Tandring  
 Derek Gorst as Prosser  
 Ronald Simpson as Smedley  
 Eric Cowley as Eric  
 Alexander Archdale as Alec  
 Sally Gray as Alice 
 Patricia Russell as Nora 
 Eric Hales
 Deering Wells

References

Bibliography
 Low, Rachael. Filmmaking in 1930s Britain. George Allen & Unwin, 1985.
 Wood, Linda. British Films, 1927-1939. British Film Institute, 1986.

External links

1935 films
British comedy films
1935 comedy films
Films directed by Reginald Denham
Quota quickies
British black-and-white films
British and Dominions Studios films
Films shot at Imperial Studios, Elstree
1930s English-language films
1930s British films